"The Lonely Bull (El Solo Toro)" is a song by Sol Lake recorded by Herb Alpert and the Tijuana Brass among others. The song was the title track to the album The Lonely Bull, released in December 1962. 
The Herb Alpert single represents the first release on A&M Records.  Its original title was "Twinkle Star".

Spanish title
"El Solo Toro" is given on the album as the Spanish translation of "The Lonely Bull", but the words el solo toro directly translate as "the bull lonely" or "the only bull". The translator evidently was not aware that in Spanish the adjective "solo" should have come after the noun "toro". "Solo" means "alone", rather than "lonely"; the proper translation of "lonely" is "solitario". In English, the adjective "lonely" precedes the noun "bull". In Spanish, the noun "toro" (the bull) comes before the adjective, "solitario". Thus, the correct translation of "The Lonely Bull" is "El Toro Solitario", as noted above.

Background
While experimenting with the sound of an overdubbed trumpet,  Herb Alpert recorded this song in his garage. The single and album recordings of the song were recorded at Conway Recorders in Hollywood by members of The Wrecking Crew, and featured the sounds of a crowd cheering "Olé" inside a bullfight arena in Mexico, as well as the sounds of the trumpets announcing the matador before he enters the bullring.  The song features a mandolin, a bass guitar, drums, and a wordless chorus, featuring a solo soprano.  A video for the song was filmed in 1967 inside the Toreo de Tijuana bullring.

Chart history
In the US, "The Lonely Bull" was a hit, peaking at #6 on the Hot 100.

Other recorded versions
The Ventures recorded a version for their 1963 Dolton album, The Ventures Play Telstar and the Lonely Bull, BST 8019.
The Shadows recorded a cover version in 1964 on the album Dance with The Shadows. The Untouchables released a cover version on their 1985 album Wild Child.
Harry James recorded a version in 1965 on the album Harry James Plays Green Onions & Other Great Hits. (Dot DLP 3634 and DLP 25634).

Samples
This song is sampled in the song "Tres Delinquentes" by Delinquent Habits.
This song is sampled in the song "All Night" by The Trash Can Sinatras on their 2016 album Wild Pendulum.

Popular culture
The chorus of the song is briefly quoted in the song “This Town” on the 1977 album Now by The Tubes.
The song is featured during a montage sequence in Cameron Crowe's film Jerry Maguire. It also appears in the Nicolas Cage film Matchstick Men, along with other jazz songs.
On the inner sleeve of the Morrissey single "I'm Throwing My Arms Around Paris", his guitarist Boz Boorer can be seen holding "The Lonely Bull."

References

External links
https://www.onamrecords.com/labels/a-m-records/146447/history A&M Records history

1962 singles
Number-one singles in Australia
Herb Alpert songs
Grammy Hall of Fame Award recipients
1962 songs
A&M Records singles
1960s instrumentals